Clinical Gastroenterology and Hepatology is a monthly peer-reviewed medical journal published by Elsevier on behalf of the American Gastroenterological Association. It was established in January 2003. According to the Journal Citation Reports, the journal has a 2021 impact factor of 13.576.

References

External links 
 

Elsevier academic journals
Gastroenterology and hepatology journals
Publications established in 2003
Monthly journals
English-language journals